Edwin William Gruffydd Richards (sometimes referred to as Edward; 15 December 1879 – 10 December 1930) was a Welsh field hockey player from Abergavenny who competed in the 1908 Summer Olympics where he won the bronze medal as a member of the Wales team.

Richards was the son of Susanna Thomas and Edwin William Richards, an iron monger from Goytre. His father died from Typhoid on the 3 September 1879; Edwin was born later that year on 15 December. He died in Ipswich on 10 December 1930.

References

External links
 
profile

1879 births
1930 deaths
Welsh male field hockey players
Olympic field hockey players of Great Britain
British male field hockey players
Field hockey players at the 1908 Summer Olympics
Olympic bronze medallists for Great Britain
Sportspeople from Abergavenny
Olympic medalists in field hockey
Welsh Olympic medallists
Medalists at the 1908 Summer Olympics